The Ministry of Communication and Information Technology()  is governmental body of Nepal that manages postal services, telecommunications, broadcasting, press and information and film development in the country. 

Nainkala Thapa is the present minister for this ministry since June 10 2021, who was minister for Women, Children and Senior Citizen ministry.

Through its subdivisions, the ministry informs the public about economic and social activities in Nepal, while promoting democratic culture through ensuring the freedom of expression and the right to information of the People of Nepal.
Its main aim is to make the communications media active and efficient.

Organisational structure
Three departments serve under the ministry to facilitate and implement its work:

 Department of Postal Service (Nepal Post)
 Department of Information
 Department of Printing

Furthermore, several Organizations also work under and with the ministry:
 Film Development Board
 Gorkhapatra Corporation
 Nepal Telecom
 Nepal Telecommunications Authority
 Nepal Television
 Press Council Nepal
 Radio Broadcasting Development Committee
 Rastriya Samachar Samiti (National News Agency)

Former Ministers of Information and Communications
This is a list of all Ministers of Information and Communications since the Nepalese Constituent Assembly election in 2013:

Notes

References

Information and Communications
Nepal
1992 establishments in Nepal